In the Government of the United Kingdom, the minister for the Civil Service is responsible for regulations regarding His Majesty's Civil Service, the role of which is to assist the governments of the United Kingdom in formulating and implementing policies. The position is invariably held by the prime minister of the United Kingdom.

The role
In recognition of the primary authority of the prime minister over the Civil Service, it is a constitutional convention that the ministry would always be held by the prime minister. The list of ministers for the civil service is therefore identical to the list of prime ministers of the United Kingdom from 1968 onwards.

By the terms of the Civil Service (Management Functions) Act 1992, the minister may delegate his or her power to ministers and others such as the Scottish Government. Prime Minister Gordon Brown appointed Tom Watson to be responsible for digital engagement and Civil Service issues, while the Prime Minister has given the chancellor of the Duchy of Lancaster and minister for the Cabinet Office (previously Michael Gove, currently Steve Barclay) responsibility for the Civil Service.

The statutory instrument The Transfer of Functions (Treasury and Minister for the Civil Service) Order 1995, which transferred functions to the minister responsible for the Civil Service, came into force on 1 April 1995.

The Constitutional Reform and Governance Act 2010 codifies the power of the Minister for the Civil Service to manage the Civil Service, including the 'power to make appointments', the publication of the Civil Service code of conduct, and the right to be consulted before publication of recruitment principles by the Civil Service Commission. The Act also requires the Minister for the Civil Service to publish a special adviser code of conduct, approve the terms and conditions of appointment of special advisers, and publish an annual report about special advisers serving the UK government.

Civil Service Department
The ministership was created for Harold Wilson on 1 November 1968 when responsibilities for the pay and management of the Civil Service was transferred from HM Treasury to a new Civil Service Department.

Margaret Thatcher announced the abolition of the Civil Service Department to the House of Commons on 12 November 1981.

Junior ministers in the Civil Service Department

References

Sources

 
 

United Kingdom
Civil Service